Entre sombras is a Colombian telenovela created by Diego Arbeláez. It aired on Caracol Televisión from 19 September 2022 to 16 December 2022. The telenovela follows Julia and Magdalena, agents of an elite group, who seek to solve priority crimes in record time, while also being in the middle of a love triangle with Ivan, a criminalist. The cases featured in the series are inspired by real life events that have been reported in the news magazine show El Rastro. It stars Flora Martínez, Margarita Muñoz, and Rodrigo Candamil.

Plot 
The disappearance of a minor in a neighborhood in the south of the city causes alarm among the authorities and prompts Colonel Velendia, head of the judicial police, to immediately instruct Captain Julia Beltrán and Sergeant Magdalena Arbeláez to create a special division, in charge of solving the most promising crimes of their careers in record time. Julia and Magdalena have very different lives. Julia is married and has a son, and Magdalena is looking for her stepfather, who abused her as a child. Julia's personal life takes a turn with the return of Iván, a renowned criminalist who was the love of her life years ago and who abandoned her without an explanation. Magdalena takes an interest in Iván and a love triangle develops as they team up to find those responsible for the most perplexing crimes of their careers.

Cast

Main 
 Flora Martínez as Julia Beltrán
 Margarita Muñoz as Magdalena Arbeláez
 Rodrigo Candamil as Iván Guerrero
 Patrick Delmas as Gerard Chabrol
 Brian Moreno as Teófilo "Teo" Mora
 Julian Díaz as Parra
 Vivian Ossa as Serrano
 Cony Camelo as Sandra Pinzón
 Roger Moreno as Vivanco
 Mario Ruiz as Buitrago
 Ian Valencia as Rodrigo Arbélaez
 Gustavo Angarita as Mayor Raúl Castañeda
 Juan David Galindo as Osorio
 Leonardo Acosta as Coronel Velandia

Recurring and guest stars 
 Jerónimo Barón
 Juan Pablo Franco

Episodes

Ratings

References

External links 
 

2022 telenovelas
2022 Colombian television series debuts
2022 Colombian television series endings
Colombian telenovelas
Caracol Televisión telenovelas
Spanish-language telenovelas